Big Day Out 06 is a New Zealand compilation album released to coincide with the Big Day Out music festival in 2006. To date, this was the last album released in this series.

Track listing
"I Wanna Be Your Dog" – Iggy & the Stooges
"The Denial Twist" – The White Stripes
"Do You Want To" – Franz Ferdinand
"L'Via L'Viaquez" – The Mars Volta
"Mind's Eye" – Wolfmother
"Good Timing" – Gerling
"Going Nowhere" – Cut Copy
"Are You The One?" – The Presets
"NY Excuse (Remix)" – Soulwax
"Entertain" – Sleater-Kinney
"King of the Rodeo" – Kings of Leon
"What's On Your Radio" – The Living End
"Forget To Remember" – Mudvayne
"O Yeah" – End of Fashion
"The Sentinel" – Hilltop Hoods
"Testify" – Common
"Galang 05" – M.I.A.
"Bottle Rocket" – The Go! Team
"Locket" – Magic Dirt
"Hurricane" – Faker
"Forever Lost" – The Magic Numbers

Music festival compilation albums
Compilation albums by New Zealand artists
2006 live albums
2006 compilation albums